Bolshoy Azhbulat is a bittern salt lake in Uspen District, Pavlodar Region, Kazakhstan.

There are mirabilite deposits in the Bolshoy Azhbulat.

Geography
Lake Bolshoy Azhbulat is an endorheic lake located in the Kulunda Steppe, southern part of the West Siberian Plain, west of the Russian border. There is an elongated island in the middle of the lake. The Burla river flows into the eastern lakeshore.

There are smaller lakes in the immediate vicinity of Bolshoy Azhbulat, including Maly Azhbulat (Кіші Әжболат), an intermittent lake on the eastern side, as well as Lake Klevkino (Клевкино) to the south.

See also
List of lakes of Kazakhstan

References

External links

 Джурбай едет на озеро Большой Ажбулат

Lakes of Kazakhstan
Endorheic lakes of Asia
Pavlodar Region
West Siberian Plain